Fidena is a genus of horse-fly in the tribe Scionini.

Species
Fidena abominata Philip, 1941
Fidena adnaticornis Castro, 1945
Fidena albibarba Enderlein, 1925
Fidena albitaeniata (Lutz, 1911)
Fidena analis (Fabricius, 1805)
Fidena atra Lutz & Castro, 1936
Fidena atripes (Röder, 1886)
Fidena aureopygia Kröber, 1931
Fidena aureosericea Kröber, 1931
Fidena auribarba (Enderlein, 1925)
Fidena auricincta (Lutz & Neiva, 1909)
Fidena aurifasciata Enderlein, 1925
Fidena aurimaculata (Macquart, 1838)
Fidena auripes (Ricardo, 1900)
Fidena aurulenta Gorayeb, 1986
Fidena basilaris (Wiedemann, 1828)
Fidena bicolor Kröber, 1931
Fidena bistriga Fairchild & Rafael, 1985
Fidena bocainensis (Lutz & Castro, 1936)
Fidena brachycephala Kröber, 1931
Fidena brasiliensis Kröber, 1931
Fidena brevistria (Lutz, 1909)
Fidena callipyga Castro, 1945
Fidena campolarguense Bassi, 1997
Fidena castanea (Perty, 1833)
Fidena castaneiventris Kröber, 1934
Fidena coscaroni Philip, 1968
Fidena decipiens Kröber, 1931
Fidena eriomera (Macquart, 1838)
Fidena eriomeroides (Lutz, 1909)
Fidena erythronotata (Bigot, 1892)
Fidena flavicrinis (Lutz, 1909)
Fidena flavipennis Kröber, 1931
Fidena flavipennis ssp. fisheri Philip, 1978
Fidena flavipennis ssp. vallensis Wilkerson, 1979
Fidena flavithorax (Kröber, 1930)
Fidena florisuga (Lutz, 1911)
Fidena foetterlei (Lutz, 1909)
Fidena freemani Barretto, 1957
Fidena fulgifascies Barretto, 1957
Fidena fulvithorax (Wiedemann, 1821)
Fidena fulvitibialis (Ricardo, 1900)
Fidena fumifera (Walker, 1854)
Fidena fusca (Thunberg, 1827)
Fidena griseithorax Burger, 2002
Fidena haywardi Philip, 1968
Fidena howardi Fairchild, 1941
Fidena kroeberi Fairchild, 1971
Fidena laterina (Rondani, 1851)
Fidena latifrons Kröber, 1931
Fidena leonina (Lutz, 1909)
Fidena leucopogon (Wiedemann, 1828)
Fidena lingens (Wiedemann, 1828)
Fidena lissorhina Gorayeb & Fairchild, 1987
Fidena longipalpis Enderlein, 1925
Fidena loricornis Kröber, 1931
Fidena maculipennis Kröber, 1931
Fidena marginalis (Wiedemann, 1830)
Fidena mattogrossensis (Lutz, 1912)
Fidena mirabilis Lutz, 1911
Fidena morio (Wulp, 1881)
Fidena neglecta Kröber, 1931
Fidena nigricans (Lutz, 1909)
Fidena nigripennis (Guerin, 1835)
Fidena nigrivittata (Macquart, 1850)
Fidena nitens (Bigot, 1892)
Fidena niveibarba Kröber, 1931
Fidena nubiapex (Lutz, 1911)
Fidena obscuripes Kröber, 1931
Fidena ochracea (Kröber, 1930)
Fidena ochrapogon Wilkerson, 1979
Fidena oldroydi (Barretto, 1957)
Fidena opaca (Brèthes, 1910)
Fidena palidetarsis Kröber, 1930
Fidena pallidula Kröber, 1933
Fidena penicillata (Bigot, 1892)
Fidena pessoai Barretto, 1957
Fidena philipi Coscarón, 2001
Fidena pseudoaurimaculata (Lutz, 1909)
Fidena pubescens (Lutz, 1909)
Fidena pusilla (Lutz, 1909)
Fidena rhinophora (Bellardi, 1859)
Fidena rubrithorax Kröber, 1931
Fidena rufibasis Kröber, 1931
Fidena ruficornis (Kröber, 1931)
Fidena rufohirta (Walker, 1848)
Fidena rufopilosus (Ricardo, 1900)
Fidena schildi (Hine, 1925)
Fidena silvatica (Brèthes, 1920)
Fidena soledadei (Lutz, 1911)
Fidena sorbens (Wiedemann, 1828)
Fidena splendens (Lutz, 1911)
Fidena submetallica (Brèthes, 1910)
Fidena sulfurea Wilkerson, 1979
Fidena tenuistria (Walker, 1848)
Fidena trapidoi Fairchild, 1953
Fidena trinidadensis Fairchild & Aitken, 1960
Fidena venosa (Wiedemann, 1821)
Fidena winthemi (Wiedemann, 1819)
Fidena zonalis Kröber, 1931

References

Tabanidae
Brachycera genera
Diptera of South America
Diptera of North America
Taxa named by Francis Walker (entomologist)